Penweddig was a medieval cantref – a Welsh land division – of the kingdom of Ceredigion and later of the kingdom of Deheubarth) which is now in the county of Ceredigion, Wales. The community secondary school Ysgol Gyfun Gymunedol Penweddig is named after the cantref.

Commotes
Penweddig comprised three commotes (cwmwd; plural cymydau):

 Genau'r Glyn
 Y Creuddyn
 Perfedd

Cantrefs
History of Ceredigion
Medieval Wales